Senallang is a state constituency in Sabah, Malaysia, that has been represented in the Sabah State Legislative Assembly.

Demographics

History

Election results

References

Sabah state constituencies